The Ranger 26 is an American sailboat, that was designed by Gary Mull.

The Ranger 26 is not related to the 1980 Mull designed Ranger 26-2, nor is it related to the Raymond Richards designed Ranger Boat Company 26 of 1978 or the Germán Frers designed 1983 Frers 26, which was marketed as the Ranger 26 by the Brazilian company Mariner Construções Náuticas Ltd for a time.

Production
The boat was built by Ranger Yachts in the United States with production from 1969 to 1975. The design is now out of production.

Design
The Ranger 26 is a small recreational keelboat, built predominantly of fiberglass. It has a masthead sloop rig, an internally-mounted spade-type rudder and a fixed fin keel. It displaces  and carries  of iron ballast.

See also
List of sailing boat types

References

Keelboats
1960s sailboat type designs
Sailing yachts
Sailboat type designs by Gary Mull
Sailboat types built by Ranger Yachts